Alexander Yakovlev may refer to:

Alexander Ivanovich Yakovlev (1863–1909), Russian entomologist and painter
Alexander Stepanovich Yakovlev (1886–1953), Russian and Soviet writer
Alexander Yevgenievich Yakovlev (1887–1938), Russian neoclassicist painter
Alexander Sergeyevich Yakovlev (1906–1989), Soviet aeronautical engineer
Alexander Yakovlev (Russian politician) (1923–2005), Soviet and Russian politician
Aleksandr Maksimovich Yakovlev (1927–2011), Soviet and Russian jurist, the Presidential Plenipotentiary to the Federal Assembly in 1994–1996
Alexander Yakovlev (diplomat), United Nations officer convicted of financial crimes in 2010
, an actor who starred in Me Ivan, You Abraham (1993)
Alexander Yakovlev (fighter) (born 1984), Russian amateur wrestler, mixed martial artist and rapper